is a former Japanese football player.

Club statistics

References

External links

1977 births
Living people
Asia University (Japan) alumni
Association football people from Tokyo Metropolis
Japanese footballers
Japanese expatriate footballers
J2 League players
Japan Football League players
FC Gifu players
Expatriate footballers in Indonesia
Liga 1 (Indonesia) players
Association football defenders
People from Nishitōkyō, Tokyo